Kotanai  Khwazakhela (Urdu: کوٹنئ, Pashto: کوٹنی) is an administrative unit, known as Union council, of Swat District in the Khyber Pakhtunkhwa province of Pakistan.
District Swat has 9 Tehsils i.e. Khwazakhela, Kabal, Madyan, Barikot, Mingora, and Kalam. Each Tehsill comprises certain numbers of union councils. There are 65 union councils in district Swat, 56 rural and 09 urban.

See also 
The Famous Pakhtoon tribe in Kotanai is Mandokhel, Head of the Tribe is Masam khan Malak, Pirjan Khan malak, Pirdad khan Malak,Kakoty Malak, Shahjahan Malak. 

later on Mahbat khan, Muhammad ayub khan, Yaqoob Khan, Qayum khan, Muhammd Naeem khan, Gulalam khan,Dawar khan 

Famous personality  Khursheed khan( DIG Swat)

Ex Nazim Amanullah khan, Engineer Azaz Ali Shah Khan ( Founder of SmartBuild Construction), Sohail Asghar khan (Media)

 Swat District

References

External links
Khyber-Pakhtunkhwa Government website section on Lower Dir
United Nations
Hajjinfo.org Uploads
 PBS paiman.jsi.com

Swat District
Populated places in Swat District
Union councils of Khyber Pakhtunkhwa
Union Councils of Swat District